Philippe Malaurie (7 March 1925 – 1 April 2020) was a French professor of private law.

Life

Philippe Malaurie was born on 7 March 1925 in Mainz, occupied by French forces.
He became a Doctor of Law at the Paris Faculty of Law in 1951.
His thesis was on L'order public et le contrat; étude de droit comparé.
He passed his agrégation in Law in 1951.
He taught at the Institut des hautes études in Tunis from 1951 to 1955, at the Faculty of Law in Poitiers from 1955 to 1966, and at the Faculty of Law of Paris from 1966 to 1970, then taught at the University of Paris II.
He was dean of the Faculty of Law of Nanterre from 1968 to 1969.
He was vice-president of the French Committee of International Private Law in 1976.
In 2003 he became a professor of Law, Economics and Social Sciences at the Paris II University.
In 2017, Malaurie was Professor Emeritus of Private Law at the Panthéon-Assas University.

Publications

Notes

Sources

1925 births
2020 deaths
French legal scholars
Academic staff of Paris 2 Panthéon-Assas University
Deaths from the COVID-19 pandemic in France